is a Japanese manga artist. He won the 1988 Shogakukan Manga Award for shōnen for his Just Meet and Fuyu Monogatari.

Works 
 
 
 Free Kick!
 
 
 
 
 
 Shō mo Nai Bokura no Renai-ron

Link

References 

1961 births
Living people
Manga artists from Hyōgo Prefecture
People from Akashi, Hyōgo